Phiala nigrolineata is a moth in the family Eupterotidae. It was described by Per Olof Christopher Aurivillius in 1903. It is found in the Democratic Republic of the Congo, South Africa, Togo, Uganda and Zambia.

The wingspan is 62 mm. The wings are pale cream colour, with all the veins outlined strongly with black, but on the hindwings, the black lines are much finer and do not extend backwards into the median area. The fringes in both wings are yellowish.

References

Moths described in 1903
Eupterotinae